Moves – International Festival of Movement on Screen is an annual experimental film and media art festival based in the North West of England.

History of the Festival

Originating from the Commonwealth Film Festival, which was founded in 2001 by Northern England media producers Michael Burke and Michael Fox, moves - International Festival of Movement on Screen was launched in June 2007 following the termination of the former due to funding cuts.

The Commonwealth Film Festival started in June 2002 as a project of the Spirit of Friendship Festival in conjunction with the Commonwealth Games in Manchester. Its opening night featured Arjun Sajnani’s ‘Agni Vasha’, and overall the festival screened over 100 features and 275 short films. The second edition focussed on a tighter programme and thus helped the festival develop an international reputation for its intelligent programming and good hospitality. Delegate networking and public access were further developed whilst maintaining the informal and friendly atmosphere of the festival. It rapidly established itself as an annual landmark event dedicated to the worldwide promotion of Commonwealth-produced film culture. The Commonwealth Film Festival held its last edition in 2006.

In 2007, festival executive director Pascale Moyse took a strand of the festival, screendance, and expanded it to the wider concept "movement on screen" and thus moves - International Festival of Movement on Screen was born. As an independent film festival, moves hosted its first edition in Manchester in June 2007. Since then, it grew to become typohe UK's largest platform for experimental screen-based art works exploring “movement" through films, videos, media installations, online works, live events, videogames, workshops and papers.

In 2010, newly appointed artistic director Gala Pujol implemented some changes in the organisation's and festival's strategy, which included the relocation to Liverpool following the city's cultural expansion after its European Capital of Culture year in 2008.
moves Festival takes place across the region each year with a new theme to approach screen-based works from different perspectives.

moves is one of the few film festivals in the UK that does not charge entry fees.

moves07: (Manchester, 12–17 June 2007)

moves08: Interaction of Sound and Movement (Manchester, 22–26 April 2008)

moves09: Beyond movement… what’s your story? (Manchester, 23–28 April 2009)

moves10: Framing Motion (Liverpool, 21–25 April 2010)

moves11: INTERSECTIONS: Filming Across Culture & Technology' (Liverpool, 25 April - 1 May 2011)

moves11: The Theme

All new art forms come into light by processes of experimentation: either by crossing, altering and pushing traditional boundaries or by merging classic conceptions/practices with new technologies/techniques. moves11 investigated the importance of these fusions in screen-based art, and tried to highlight connections that look at multicultural and interdisciplinary creation, as well as new forms of representation that question conventions and move towards the creation of new genres and disciplines.

moves is committed to showcase the best experimental works exploring "movement on screen" from around the world and so far has showcased works from artists such as Gina Czarnecki, Goran Vejvoda, Simon Fildes, Alex Reuben, Sergio Cruz, or Telenoika, guests included Donald Glowinski, Judy Gladstone, Jamie Watton. The moves11 award - the main prize of the 2011 edition of the festival - was awarded to "Spin" by Max Hattler.

Alternative Routes
Since 2010 moves is partner and coordinator of Alternative Routes, a new European network of festivals based in non-capital cities.
AR partners include 700IS Reindeerland - Festival of Experimental film and video (Egilstaðir, Iceland), FRAME Research (Porto, Portugal) and MODEM (Debrecen, Hungary).

More information at www.movementonscreen.org.uk/alternativeroutes.

References 

www.movementonscreen.org.uk.

www.brenocallaghan.co.uk/?s=moves10.

www.700.is.
www.fabricademovimento.pt.
www.modemart.hu.

External links 

 Film Festivals
 www.movementonscreen.org.uk

Film festivals in England
Dance festivals in the United Kingdom
New media art festivals
Film festivals established in 2001